Vladislav Igorevich Ignatenko (born 2 January 1998) is a Russian football player who plays for FC Avangard Kursk. He was born and raised in Ukraine as Vladyslav Ihorovych Ihnatenko and acquired Russian citizenship in 2016.

Club career
He made his debut in the Russian Football National League for FC Shinnik Yaroslavl on 27 February 2021 in a game against FC Chayka Peschanokopskoye.

References

External links
 
 Profile by Russian Football National League
 

1998 births
People from Kirovsk, Luhansk Oblast
Ukrainian emigrants to Russia
Living people
Russian footballers
Ukrainian footballers
Ukraine youth international footballers
Association football midfielders
FC Lokomotiv Moscow players
FC KAMAZ Naberezhnye Chelny players
FC Shinnik Yaroslavl players
FC Nosta Novotroitsk players
FC Avangard Kursk players
Russian First League players
Russian expatriate footballers
Expatriate footballers in Slovakia
Russian expatriate sportspeople in Slovakia